This article shows the match statistics of the South Korea national football team.

Results by year

1950s

1960s

1970s

1980s

1990s

2000s

2010s

2020s

Largest margins

Biggest victories

Heaviest defeats

See also
 South Korea national football team
 South Korea national football team records and statistics

External links
  KFA Website : Official Fixtures/Results of National Team